"Break in the Weather" is a song by New Zealand musician Jenny Morris. It was released in September 1991 the lead single from her third studio album, Honeychild (1991). The song became Morris's highest-peaking single in Australia, reaching number two for a week, behind "Rush" by Big Audio Dynamite II. In her native New Zealand, the song made it to number five, making it her second-most-successful single, after 1989's "She Has to Be Loved".

Track listings
Australian CD-maxi
 "Break in the Weather"  – 4:28
 "Lenny" – 4:38
 "Break in the Weather"  – 5:49
 "She Has to Be Loved"  – 6:24

German 7-inch vinyl
A. "Break in the Weather"  – 3:36
B. "Lenny" – 4:38

Charts

Weekly charts

Year-end charts

Certifications

References

1991 songs
1991 singles
East West Records singles
Jenny Morris (musician) songs
Song recordings produced by Nick Launay